Perçante was a 20-gun ship-corvette of the French Navy, built at Bayonne and launched in 1795. The British captured her in 1796 and took her into the Royal Navy under the name HMS Jamaica. They rated her as a sixth-rate 26-gun frigate. She served during both the French Revolutionary Wars and part of the Napoleonic Wars, during which she captured some privateers and participated in a boat attack. The Admiralty had her laid up in 1810 and sold her in 1814.

Design
Perçante was one of four Bonne Citoyenne-class corvettes launched between 1794 and 1796, all four of which the Royal Navy captured between 1796 and 1798. The class was built to a design by Raymond-Antoine Haran. All members of the class were flush-decked, but with a long topgallant forecastle.

French service
Perçante was stationed at Bayonne and Rochefort. Initially she was under the command of enseigne de vaisseau Laporte, who commanded her from 13 June 1795 to 17 August.

His replacement was lieutenant de vaisseau (later capitaine de frégate) Tourtelot. He commanded her at least during the period 20 October to 23 November.

Her first major voyage was to Guyane, where she first delivered member of the National Convention Bertrand Barère into exile, and then delivered dispatches and supplies to the Antilles. Her second voyage had her carrying arms and munitions from the Île-d'Aix roads with destinations Cayenne and then Basse-Terre. For this voyage she was under the command of lieutenant de vaisseau (later capitaine de frégate) Tourtelot (the elder).

Capture
On 6 December 1795, Perçante departed La Rochelle, under orders from the Minister of Marine and Colonies not to communicate with any vessel on the way.

In late February 1796, Perçante was sailing from Cayenne to Cap Français when, near Samana Bay, around 21:00, she encountered the 64-gun third rate , patrolling and looking for reinforcements expected from Cork. Intrepid gave chase, and the two ships exchanged fire from 23:00 until 04:00 the next morning, when the wind strengthened, giving an advantage to Perçante.

However, Perçante soon sighted two British corvettes to the north and a frigate in the south; Tourtelot then ordered Perçante beached in a cove to the east of Porto Plata. Intrepid anchored and started bombarding Perçante, forcing her crew to abandon her after destroying her pumps and opening her sea valves in an attempt to scuttle her.

The British nevertheless managed to retrieve Perçante, and commissioned her in the Royal Navy as the sixth-rate HMS Jamaica. Tourtellot was honourably acquitted of the loss of his ship.

British service
Commander Samuel Brooking commissioned Jamaica in April 1796, on the Jamaica station, where he and she would remain for some three years. (Brooking received his promotion to post captain, the appropriate rank for the captain of a frigate, in July 1796.)

On 27 November 1796 Jamaica captured Adélaïde and on 10 June 1797 Dix Après.

During the period 29 October 1797 and 12 March 1798 Jamaica destroyed a French 10-gun privateer schooner, name unknown. On 7 February 1798 she captured the French privateer schooner Fortunée. The schooner was armed with one or more 4-pounder guns.

Towards the end of the next year, on 27 November 1798, Jamaica captured Rebecca, and then on 9 December she captured the Fox.

Early in 1799, that is on 7 January, 27 January, and 24 February, Jamaica captured the vessels Shark, Friends, and Gravenhorst. Also, between 12 February and 30 March, Jamaica captured two merchant vessels. Later that year Jamaica sailed to Britain.

later, on 25 July, Jamaica,  and  passed Plymouth as they sailed up the Channel escorting the East India, Jamaica, Lisbon, and Oporto fleets.  On 22 August Jamaica arrived at Deptford; she was paid off there in August. She remained at Deptford for repairs until October, with Captain John Mackeller recommissioning her in September.

Mackeller escorted a fleet of merchantmen to and from the Baltic and recaptured an English mast-ship and a brig laden with corn. He also forced a privateer, under the command of Captain Blankeman, to throw 14 guns and other gear overboard during an unsuccessful, for Jamaica, chase. The two English vessels recaptured may have been the Duke of Athol and James and Ruth on 13 and 14 December 1800.

In 1801 Captain James Brisbane replaced Mackeller, only  to have Captain Jonas Rose replaced Brisbane, still in March. Rose then sailed Jamaica to the Baltic, where she participated in the Battle of Copenhagen. Jamaica and the various British brigs and gunvessels were tasked with raking the southern end of the Danish line. Towards the end of the battle, Jamaica was nearby when the Danish ship of the line Dannebrog exploded. In 1847 the Admiralty awarded the Naval General Service medal with clasp "Copenhagen" to all the surviving British claimants from the battle.

Jamaica returned to the Channel and on 20 and 21 August her boats and several vessels were involved in action in the neighbourhood of Étaples. On the evening of 20 August Jamaica was off Etaples when she heard cannon fire and lookouts saw a large fire. Rose sailed to investigate, encountering , which informed him that the fire  came from a cargo of pitch and tar on a vessel wrecked on the coast some time previously that boats from Hound and  had set on fire. Six flat boats had come out of Saint Valery but Hound had forced them onshore, where they still lay. As the boats went in the ships themselves provide covering fire. The boats brought out two launches and a flat boat 45' long and 24' wide, armed with an 8" howitzer. However, the latter later sank; the other three on shore had already been so damaged that they were irretrievable, but the landing party still did as much further damage as time permitted. Jamaica lost one man killed, and each of the other four British vessels had a man wounded in the effort.

In 1803–1804, Jamaica captured or recaptured a number of vessels. 
Jeune Carolie (or Jeune Corallie), 2 June;
Dutch ship Jeune Marie, 2 June, in company with the privateer Lord Nelson;
Marie and Madaline, French fishing vessels, 7 June; 
Sirene, 19 June;
Brigs Eagle and Leander, recaptured 5 January 1804;

During this period, on 13 August 1803, Jamaica was seven leagues off the Isle de Bas, when she captured the French privateer Fanny. Fanny was a cutter of two guns and 20 men. She had only been out 12 hours before Jamaica captured her and had made no captures herself.

Captain John Dick replaced Rose on 24 November 1804. Under his command Jamaica served on the Channel and Newfoundland stations. He sailed Jamaica for Newfoundland on 19 January 1806. On 10 April, perhaps on the way, Jamaica and  detained Algema Belong.

On 7 November, Jamaica recaptured the brig Margaret, B. Vickers, master.

In 1807 Captain Arthur Lysaght, who had been promoted to post captain on 25 September 1806, commanded Jamaica on the Jersey station.

Jamaica and  shared in the proceeds of the capture.

Jamaica appears to have had her share of disciplinary problems. On 29 October 1807, a court martial was convened aboard . First, Surgeon W.W. Hutchinson was tried for making provoking speeches and gestures towards Lieutenant J. Mascall of the Royal Marines. Hutchinson called the purser as a witness, but Mascall objected, arguing that the purser was an atheist. Lieutenant Philip Helpman gave evidence concerning the purser's character that led to the purser being dismissed the service. Then the court martial tried the master, Mr. Hartree for drunkenness and contempt towards Lysaght. Mascall was tried also for drunkenness and abusive behavior towards Hutchinson. Helpman was tried for striking a marine sergeant and sentinel while on duty. Lastly, Hutchinson was tried for using gross and abusive language to Hartree. The court martial board sentenced Hartree to a severe reprimand and admonished him to be more careful in the future, Hutchinson to a reprimand, and Helpman to be dismissed the service.

Later, Lysaght sailed Jamaica to Newfoundland three times, on 12 June 1808, in 1809, and on 27 May 1810. Between the second and third voyages, Jamaica was in company with  when they recaptured the American brig Iris. On 11 August Jamaica captured the American schooner Virginia.

Fate
Jamaica was laid up in ordinary at Portsmouth in November 1810. The Principal Officers and Commissioners of His Majesty's Navy offered "Jamaica, of 26 guns and 522 tons", lying at Portsmouth, for sale on 11 August 1814. The buyer had to post a bond of £3,000, with two guarantors, that they would break up the vessel within a year of purchase. She sold on that day for £1,300.

See also
List of ships captured in the 19th century
Glossary of nautical terms (A-L)
Glossary of nautical terms (M-Z)

Notes, sources & references

Notes

Citations

References
Anon. (1833) The Georgian Era: Memoirs of the Most Eminent Persons, who Have Flourished in Great Britain : from the Accession of George the First to the Demise of George the Fourth; in 4 Vol. Military and naval commanders; judges and barristers; physicians and surgeons. (Vizetelly, Branston).
Fonds Marine. Campagnes (opérations; divisions et stations navales; missions diverses). Inventaire de la sous-série Marine BB4. Tome premier: BB4 1 à 209 (1790-1804) 

Sixth rates of the Royal Navy
Ships built in France
Age of Sail corvettes of France
Captured ships
1795 ships
Bonne Citoyenne-class corvettes